Alanson Hamilton Barnes (April 15, 1817 – May 11, 1890) was an associate justice of the Dakota Territory Supreme Court and the namesake of Barnes County, North Dakota.

Career
Born in Turin, New York in 1817, Barnes served on the Court from 1873 until 1881.

Death
He died in 1890 and is buried at Spring Grove Cemetery in Walworth County, Wisconsin.

Family
Barnes' son-in-law was Alfred Delavan Thomas, who served as a Judge of the United States District Court for the District of North Dakota, appointed by President Benjamin Harrison.

References

External links
 

1817 births
1890 deaths
Justices of the Dakota Territorial Supreme Court
People from Lewis County, New York
Burials in Wisconsin
Barnes County, North Dakota
19th-century American judges